Tenodera superstitiosa is a species in the family Mantidae.

Range
It is found in West Africa (Cameroon, Ivory Coast, Guinea, Ghana, Mauritania, Republic of the Congo, Sierra Leone, Burkina Faso).

Subspecies
Tenodera superstitiosa superstitiosa (Fabricius, 1781)
Tenodera superstitiosa bokiana (Giglio-Tos, 1907), may not be a valid subspecies

References

Mantidae
Mantodea of Africa
Insects described in 1781